Lazar Koprivica (born ) is a Serbian male volleyball player. Having played six seasons for the first team his home club OK Crvena Zvezda Belgrade from 2009 to 2015, winning four championship titles
, he continued international career in French Rennes Volley 35 (2015/16), Greek Iraklis Thessaloniki V.C. (2016) and Romanian SCM U Craiova (2017).

As a junior, Koprivica played for various selections of the national team, and won bronze medals at both 2010 European Junior Championship and 2011 World Junior Championship, and a silver at the 2013 U-24 championship in Brazil. With the B-section of the Serbia men's national volleyball team he competed at the 2015 European Games in Baku.

See also
 Serbia at the 2015 European Games

References

1991 births
Living people
Serbian men's volleyball players
Volleyball players at the 2015 European Games
European Games competitors for Serbia
Place of birth missing (living people)
Serbian expatriate sportspeople in France
Serbian expatriate sportspeople in Greece
Serbian expatriate sportspeople in Romania
21st-century Serbian people